Weather Girl is a 2009 comedy film written and directed by Blayne Weaver and starring Tricia O'Kelley, Mark Harmon, Jon Cryer, and Enrico Colantoni.

After a morning show personality discovers her boyfriend's infidelity, she loses it on-air, costing her her job and forcing her to move in with her younger brother. She must cope with being 35, single and working for minimum wage and has an unlikely romance with a younger man.

Plot
Sylvia Miller, a Seattle morning show weather television personality, after learning her boyfriend Dale Waters and anchor for their show has cheated on her with his co-anchor Sherry, shames him on air. Her live freak out includes quitting her job.

Sylvia is forced to move in with her younger brother, as she was living with Dale. She must cope with being 35, single and unemployable in her chosen profession as she's committed professional suicide. 

To retrieve her things from her old place she gets Byron and Walt, who are six months younger, to act as her muscle. Dale and Sherry are napping when they arrive, and when she finds them she loses it, climbing on the bed and slapping him. Before she goes, Dale says he cheated because she didn't love him and she was cold.
 
After several unsuccessful job interviews it becomes clear that Sylvia can't work in broadcast journalism. Desperate to get back to earning money, she eventually gets a job 
working at a low-paying waitress job. 

That night, Sylvia agrees to go on a date with Charles, set up by her girlfriends. Walt and Byron decide to give them a hard time. On the date, he comes on very strong, talking about wanting to get married, already having chosen the names of their future children even.  

Arriving back to the apartment, Sylvia tells Byron that Charles was creepy. He proposes he be her rebound guy, initially resistant, after a moment she says yes. The conditions are, just physical with no strings, and not tell Walt. 

The fling is the only thing making Sylvia's life tolerable. Their secret is out when Walt walks in on her and Byron. He fears what it may do to his friendship, but Sylvia insists it is purely physical with no strings. 

Customers constantly bug her about her tv blow up and the kitchen staff harass her in Spanish. She finally shows them she knows some Spanish, improving bonding with them. Byron shows up at the restaurant, coercing her into going on a date, which is bonding on a walk.

Byron inadvertently finds out through Sylvia that their mom died when she was 14, he was 10, so they raised each other. They bump into her friends who she's not had contact with since she and Byron started hooking up, and they bring up the age difference. 

At work, Sylvia performs the Heimlich maneuver on a choking customer, which goes viral. Simultaneously Walt notices that Byron is truly interested in her as her former boss calls, proposing she co-anchor with Dale. 

Invited to a dinner with Dale, that he allows her to decide if it is just professional or also intimate, Walt admonishes her for going. Byron stops by to let her know how he feels, but she says she doesn't reciprocate. At the dinner Dale says he wants her back, but she doesn't allow him to kiss her.

Early, just minutes before Sylvia goes on the air, Walt appears and again asks her not to be a sellout. While the camera is rolling, she reiterates that Dale is a prick, that she is not going to sell out and thanks her brother for helping bring her to her senses.

In the dressing room, Byron is waiting for Sylvia. They both declare their love and kiss.

Cast
 Tricia O'Kelley as Sylvia Miller
 Patrick J. Adams as Byron
 Ryan Devlin as Walt
 Mark Harmon as Dale Waters
 Jon Cryer as Charles
 Enrico Colantoni as George
 Amie Donegan as Mary
 Timothy Dvorak as Jack
 Kaitlin Olson as Sherry
 Alex Kapp Horner as Emily
 Marin Hinkle as Jane
 Lucas Fleischer as Arthur
 Bubba Lewis as Irving
 Jane Lynch as J.D.

Five actors from Two and a Half Men are in the cast. Two actors from It's Always Sunny in Philadelphia are also in the cast, as well as two more from Brothers & Sisters.

Filming locations
Los Angeles, California, United States

Reception
Weather Girl received mixed to mostly negative reviews and a critic rating of 33% on Rotten Tomatoes, based on 9 reviews.

References

External links
 
 
 

2009 films
2000s English-language films
Films set in Seattle
2009 romantic comedy films
American romantic comedy films
Cultural depictions of weather presenters
Films about weather
2000s American films